The Philadelphia Museum of Jewish Art, founded in 1975, located within historic Congregation Rodeph Shalom, is dedicated to exhibiting contemporary art that illuminates the Jewish experience. The museum has organized solo and group exhibitions of work in many mediums by artists of diverse backgrounds.

In addition to its special-exhibit gallery, the Museum features a permanent collection of important works by accomplished artists including William Anastasi, Chaim Gross, Tobi Kahn, Joan Snyder, Shelley Spector, Boaz Vaadia and Roman Vishniac.

Showcased in the Thalheimer Entrance Foyer of the synagogue on Broad Street is the museum's Leon J. and Julia S. Obermayer Collection of Jewish Ritual Art.

References

External links

Art museums established in 1975
Art museums and galleries in Philadelphia
Jewish art
Jewish museums in the United States
Poplar, Philadelphia